Heavy Young Heathens are American film, film trailer, and television composers, consisting of brothers Aron and Robert Mardo. They are known for their work composing and performing music for television series including Big Sky, Eastbound & Down, The Simpsons, The Righteous Gemstones, and Dead to Me. They have also composed music for films such as Halloween, Don Verdean, Rules Don't Apply, Yoga Hosers, and Masterminds. Heavy Young Heathens co-composed and perform "Being Evil Has a Price", the main theme to the popular Netflix series Lucifer. Most recently, Heavy Young Heathens composed and perform the original song "Psalm 28.7" for the first episode of The Righteous Gemstones second season. In the scene, Eric Andre and Jessica Lowe are seen performing the song in front of their Texas Megachurch congregation as Lyle and Lindy Lissons.

History
Heavy Young Heathens released their self-titled debut on September 1, 2009. It hit the FMQB Top 5 on the album chart, and the single "Sha La La La La" charted at No. 16 on FMQB.

Their second EP, Make Room For The Youth, was released April 2010, debuting Top 5 on the FMQB Specialty Radio Charts and Top 20 on the Mediaguide Radio Charts.

In February 2022, the duo sued U.S. skating pair Alexa Knierim and Brandon Frazier and the network NBC for the alleged "unauthorized use" of their recording to the song "House of the Rising Sun" that they composed and was used for the trailer to the film The Magnificent Seven.

Discography

 Heavy Young Heathens (2009)
 Make Room for the Youth (2010)
 Don Verdean Original Soundtrack (2015)
 Cold Dark City (2016)
 The Righteous (2022)

Film
 REFUGEE (2020)
 Reversal Of Fortune (2020)
 Halloween (2018 film) (2018)
 Low Low (2018)
 Rules Don't Apply (2016)
 Masterminds (2016)
 Yoga Hosers (2016)
 Mother's Day (2016)
 Don Verdean (2015)
 Hitman: Agent 47 (2015)
 Supermensch: The Legend of Shep Gordon (2013)
 Nitro Circus: The Movie (2012)

Film Trailers
 Runt (2020)
 Angry Birds 2 (2019)
 Hotel Artemis (2018)
 Kingsman: The Golden Circle (2017)
 True Memoirs of an International Assassin (2016)
 The Magnificent Seven (2016)
 Deadpool (2016)
 Hardcore Henry (2015)
 Ant-Man (2015)
 The Man from U.N.C.L.E. (2015)
 Get on Up (2014)
 The Amazing Spider-Man 2 (2014)
 Need for Speed (2014)
 Horns  (2013)
 Hansel & Gretel: Witch Hunters (2013)
 The Amazing Spider-Man (2012)
 The Expendables 2 (2012)
 Real Steel (2011)
 Johnny English Reborn (2011)
 Underground Comedy
 TNT's Dallas (2012)
 The Rum Diary (2011)
 Footloose  (2011)
 The Treasure of Kasban LakeTelevision
Theme songs
 Lucifer (2016–2021)
 Slednecks (2014)
 Are You the One? Ain't That America (2013)
 Buckwild (2013)
 The Wanted Life (2013)
 Warped Roadies (2012)
 Punk'd 
 Ultimate Parkour Challenge (2009) 
 Hillbillies for HireFeatured music
 The Simpsons Big Sky (American TV series) Dead to Me (TV series) The Righteous Gemstones Mr_Inbetween Stumptown_(TV_series)  Vinyl Rock and Roll Hall of Fame CSI CSI: Cyber Criminal Minds Criminal Minds: Beyond Borders Shameless Eastbound & Down Looking Married The Grinder The Mindy Project 90210 Inside the NFL Ringer Revenge Do No Harm The Emmys Jersey Shore 
 Teen Wolf Punk'd (Season 9) 
 Warped Roadies (Season 1) 
 Ridiculousness Fantasy Factory Loiter Squad Death Valley Teen Mom 16 and Pregnant 
 Repo Games World of Jenks 
 The Inbetweeners 
 Good Vibes Underemployed 
 Zach Stone is Going to Be Famous Friendzone The Wanted Life Nightwatch Wahlburgers Smerconish Q with Jian Ghomeshi 30 for 30Commercials
 Fiat
 Starbucks "Morning Routine" (2017)
 Land Rover
 Chrysler 
 Dodge 
 Ford
 Kawasaki motorcycles 
 Bacardi 
 Actionshot Camera
 GoPro
 Adidas 
 Vans
 Red Bull
 Monster Energy
 UEFA European Championship

Video games
The song "Sha La La La La" is featured in the 2011 video game Saints Row: The Third'', in music station 89.0 Generation X's track list.

References

External links 
 Official Website

Indie rock musical groups from California
Musical groups from Los Angeles
Psychedelic rock music groups from California
Rock music duos